In meteorology, absolute angular momentum refers to the angular momentum in an 'absolute' coordinate system (absolute time and space).

Introduction

Mathematically,

Definition

Absolute angular momentum sums the angular momentum of a particle or fluid parcel in a relative coordinate system and the angular momentum of that relative coordinate system.

Meteorologists typically express the three vector components of velocity  (eastward, northward, and upward).

where
  represents absolute angular momentum per unit mass of the fluid parcel (in ),
  represents distance from the center of the earth to the fluid parcel (in ),
  represents earth-relative eastward component of velocity of the fluid parcel (in ),
  represents latitude (in ), and

The first term represents the angular momentum of the parcel with respect to the surface of the earth, which depends strongly on weather. The second term represents the angular momentum of the earth itself at a particular latitude (essentially constant at least on non-geological timescales).

Applications

In the shallow troposphere of the earth, one can approximate , the distance between the fluid parcel and the center of the earth approximately equal to the mean Earth radius:

where
  represents absolute angular momentum per unit mass of the fluid parcel (in ),
  represents earth-relative eastward component of velocity of the fluid parcel (in ),
  represents latitude (in ), and

At the North Pole and South Pole (latitude ), no absolute angular momentum can exist ( because ).  If a fluid parcel with no eastward wind speed originating at the equator ( so ) conserves its angular momentum as it moves poleward, then its eastward wind speed increases dramatically:  .  After those substitutions, or after further simplification, . Solution for  gives .  If , then .

The zonal pressure gradient and eddy stresses cause torque that changes the absolute angular momentum of fluid parcels.

References

Angular momentum
Meteorological concepts
Rotation